The Capocannoniere award (literally "head gunner"), known as Paolo Rossi Award since 2021, is awarded by the Italian Footballers' Association (AIC) to the highest goalscorer of each season in Italy's Serie A. The award is currently held by Ciro Immobile, who scored 27 goals for Lazio in the 2021–22 season.

The highest number of goals scored to win the Capocannoniere is 36, by Gino Rossetti for Torino in 1928–29, Gonzalo Higuaín for Napoli in 2015–16 and Ciro Immobile for Lazio in 2019–20. Ferenc Hirzer, Julio Libonatti and Gunnar Nordahl are in joint fourth place for this record; they each scored 35 goals for Juventus, Torino and Milan respectively.

Gunnar Nordahl of Milan has won the title of capocannoniere five times: 1949–50, 1950–51, 1952–53, 1953–54 and 1954–55, more than any other player in the history of Italian championship.

Winners
Data relating to seasons prior to 1923–24 are incomplete or imprecise due to scarcity of sources.
Key

* Italian by naturalisation.

Awards won by player
For 16 seasons the capocannonieri are unknown.

Awards won by club

For 14 seasons the clubs are unknown. Current Serie A teams are shown in bold.

Awards won by nationality

For 16 seasons the nationalities are unknown.

See also

List of Serie A players with 100 or more goals
Pichichi Trophy
Premier League Golden Boot
List of Bundesliga top scorers by season
List of La Liga top scorers
European Golden Shoe
List of Ligue 1 top scorers

References

External links
 Italy – Serie A Top Scorers at RSSSF.com

Serie A records and statistics
Serie A trophies and awards
Association football in Italy lists
Italy